City Of Bastards is a 2019 Nigerian crime thriller movie produced by Titilope Orire and directed by Yemi Morafa under the production studio of A Silueta Entertainment Studio production. The movie that reveals the daily life of people in the slum stars Ifu Ennada, Femi Branch Bolanle Ninolowo, Linda Osifo and Stan Nze.

Plot 
The movie focused on different didactical themes that affect the lives of people especially in the ghetto such as inter community violence, drug abuse, prostitution and child trafficking. The movie is narrated with lead character called King, who is trying to balance his past with the present in order to maintain his position as the King of the Slum.

Cast 
Bolanle Ninolowo,

Linda Osifo,

Stan Nze,

Omowunmi Dada,

Ayobami Alvin,

Shaffy Bello,

Femi Branch,

Funky Mallam,

Ifu Ennada,

Judith Audu and

Etinosa Idemudia

References 

2019 films
English-language Nigerian films
Nigerian crime films
Nigerian action thriller films
Nigerian action drama films